Fredrikinkatu (Helsinki slang: Freda) is a street in Helsinki, Finland that starts from Viiskulma in the district of Punavuori and continues north by the western side of Kamppi Center until it reaches Lutherinkatu and the Temppeliaukio Church in Etu-Töölö. 

Fredrikinkatu is mostly a northbound one-way street. Helsinki tram lines 1 and 3 run on Fredrikinkatu in both directions between Viiskulma and Bulevardi. There's a disused section of tram track between Urho Kekkosen katu and Arkadiankatu.

Major buildings 

Fredrikinkatu 21 (Ratakatu 12): the headquarters of the Finnish Security Intelligence Service, designed by E. Sihvola in 1888.
Fredrikinkatu 44: Sähkötalo, designed by Alvar Aalto. Sähkötalo is located across Fredrikinkatu from Kamppi Center.
Fredrikinkatu 65: Tennispalatsi.

The majority of the buildings along Fredrikinkatu are full of small shops and boutiques, especially in the area between Iso Roobertinkatu and Eerikinkatu.

Intersecting streets 

 Merimiehenkatu
 Punavuorenkatu (to the left) / Ratakatu (to the right), Fredrikintori Square is in the intersection
 Iso Roobertinkatu, a pedestrian-only street east of Fredrikinkatu 
 Uudenmaankatu
 Bulevardi
 Lönnrotinkatu
 Kalevankatu
 Eerikinkatu
 Malminkatu (to the left) / Kansakoulukatu (to the right)
 Malminrinne (to the left) / Urho Kekkosen katu (to the right), open only to public transportation
 The triangular-shaped area between Fredrikinkatu, Malminkatu and Malminrinne is a square called Kampintori
 Kampinkuja (to the left), a small promenade
 Salomonkatu, a promenade east of Fredrikinkatu 
 Eteläinen Rautatienkatu
 Baana, a bicycling super highway, runs perpendicular to Fredrikinkatu, under street level
 Pohjoinen Rautatienkatu
 Arkadiankatu
 Dagmarinkatu (to the right)

References

External links 
 

Streets in Helsinki